Pauline Valerie Lloyd-Chandos (24 May 1933 – 5 February 2016) was a British diver, who ranked 12th in the Women's 10m platform event at the 1952 Summer Olympics. In July 1950, she competed in the National Diving Championship  at Morecambe and Heysham. Part of her practice for this event involved diving into a sand pit in her back garden in Teddington.

References

External links
 

1933 births
2016 deaths
British female divers
Olympic divers of Great Britain
Divers at the 1952 Summer Olympics